Felix Masár (born December 2, 1955 in Šamorín) is a Slovak sprint canoeist who competed for Czechoslovakia in the late 1970s and early 1980s. He won a bronze medal in the K-1 1000 m event at the 1979 ICF Canoe Sprint World Championships in Duisburg.

Masár also competed at the 1980 Summer Olympics in Moscow, finishing sixth in the K-1 1000 m and eighth in the K-1 500 m events.

References
 
 
 Sports-reference.com profile

1955 births
Canoeists at the 1980 Summer Olympics
Czechoslovak male canoeists
Slovak male canoeists
Living people
Olympic canoeists of Czechoslovakia
ICF Canoe Sprint World Championships medalists in kayak